The 2018 Louth Senior Football Championship was the 125th edition of the Louth GAA's premier club Gaelic football tournament for senior graded teams in County Louth, Ireland. The tournament consisted of 12 teams, with the winner going on to represent Louth in the Leinster Senior Club Football Championship. The championship started with a group stage and then progressed to a knock out stage. The draw for the group stages of the championship was made on 8 March 2018.

Newtown Blues were the defending champions after they defeated the Dundalk Gaels in the previous year's final. This was O'Connell's return to the senior grade after claiming the 2017 Louth Intermediate Football Championship title, making a straight bounce back to the top flight after they were relegated to the I.F.C. in 2016.

Team changes
The following teams have changed division since the 2017 championship season.

To S.F.C.
Promoted from 2017 Louth Intermediate Football Championship
 O'Connell's  -  (Intermediate Champions)

From S.F.C.
Relegated to 2018 Louth Intermediate Football Championship
 Cooley Kickhams

Group stage
The top two finishers in each group (A, B, C, and D) qualified for the quarter-finals. The bottom finishers of each group qualified for the Relegation Play-off. The draw for the group stages of the championship was made on 8 March 2018.

Group A

Round 1
 Dreadnots 1-17, 2-12 St. Mary's Ardee, Dunleer, 8/7/2018,

Round 2
 Dreadnots 2-9, 0-9 Seán O'Mahonys, Castlebellingham, 15/7/2018,

Round 3
 Seán O'Mahonys 3-15, 3-12 St. Mary's Ardee, Ecco Road, 21/7/2018,

Group B

Round 1
 Newtown Blues 1-16, 1-7 Naomh Máirtín, Dunleer, 8/7/2018,

Round 2
 Newtown Blues 1-17, 1-9 Kilkerley Emmets, Castlebellingham, 15/7/2018,

Round 3
 Naomh Máirtín 3-11, 1-9  Kilkerley Emmets, Dunleer, 22/7/2018,

Group C

Round 1
 Geraldines 0-10, 0-9 St. Patrick's, Dowdallshill, 8/7/2018,

Round 2
 Dundalk Gaels 1-12, 0-12 Geraldines, Ecco Road, 15/7/2018,

Round 3
 St. Patrick's 1-13, 0-12 Dundalk Gaels, Ecco Road, 21/7/2018,

Group D

Round 1
 O'Raghallaighs 1-12, 0-13 St. Joseph's, Castlebellingham, 7/7/2018,

Round 2
 O'Connell's 3-18, 3-11 O'Raghallaighs, Dunleer, 14/7/2018,

Round 3
 St. Joseph's 0-16, 1-10 O'Connell's, Dunleer, 22/7/2018,

Knock-out Stages

Relegation play-off
The four bottom finishers from each group qualified for the relegation play off. The team to lose both matches was relegated to the 2018 Intermediate Championship.

Finals
The winners and runners up of each group qualified for the quarter finals.

Quarter-finals

Semi-finals

Final

Leinster Senior Club Football Championship

References

Louth SFC
Louth Senior Football Championship
Louth Senior Football Championship